Jock's Lodge railway station served the area of Jock's Lodge, Edinburgh, Scotland from 1847 to 1848 on the Waverley Route and the East Coast Main Line.

History 
This short lived station opened in September 1847 by the North British Railway. It was only open for 10 months, closing on 1 July 1848.

References

External links 

Disused railway stations in Edinburgh
Railway stations in Great Britain opened in 1847
Railway stations in Great Britain closed in 1848
Former North British Railway stations
1847 establishments in Scotland
1848 disestablishments in Scotland